The 6th Canadian Comedy Awards, presented by the Canadian Comedy Foundation for Excellence (CCFE), honoured the best live, television, and film comedy of 2004. The awards ceremony was held on 22 October 2005 during the five-day Canadian Comedy Awards Festival in London, Ontario. The ceremony was hosted by Bruce Hunter as Rocko the Dog.

Canadian Comedy Awards, also known as Beavers, were awarded in 20 categories. Winners were picked by members of ACTRA (Alliance of Canadian Cinema, Television and Radio Artists), the Canadian Actors' Equity Association, the Writers Guild of Canada, the Directors Guild of Canada, and the Comedy Association.

Nominations were led by the film Ham & Cheese with six nominations, followed by TV series Corner Gas and This Hour Has 22 Minutes with five apiece.  Corner Gas won two Beavers, as did Kristen Thomson for the film I, Claudia and Levi Macdougall for his Comedy Now! show. The Chairman's Award went to producer Andrew Alexander of The Second City.

Festival
The 6th Canadian Comedy Awards and Festival ran from 18 to 22 October 2005 in London, Ontario, its third year in the city.  Each day featured talent showcases beginning with the Funniest Person in London Contest, sketch, stand-up and improv shows, and an all-star gala hosted by Seán Cullen.  Among the highlights was the Jokers vs. Knights Alumni charity hockey game which mixed two of Canada's favourite pastimes, with two teams of comics, celebrities and retired professional hockey players aided by guest announcers, coaches, and musicians.

Ceremony

The 6th Canadian Comedy Awards ceremony was held on 22 October 2005, hosted by Bruce Hunter as Rocko the Dog, the character he played on Puppets Who Kill. Hunter had won the Beaver for Best Male Improviser in 2001.

Winners and nominees
Winners are listed first and highlighted in boldface:

Live

Television

Film

Special Awards

Multiple wins
The following people, shows, films, etc. received multiple awards

Multiple nominations
The following people, shows, films, etc. received multiple nominations

References

External links
Canadian Comedy Awards official website

Canadian Comedy Awards
Canadian Comedy Awards
Awards
Awards